Gary David Goldberg (June 25, 1944 – June 22, 2013) was an American writer and producer for television and film. Goldberg was best known for his work on Family Ties (1982–89), Spin City (1996–2002), and his semi-autobiographical series Brooklyn Bridge (1991–93).

Background
Gary David Goldberg was born on June 25, 1944, in Brooklyn, New York, the son of Anne (née Prossman) and George Goldberg, a postal worker. He had an older brother, Stan, who is 5 years older and a well-known summer camp director. Goldberg grew up in Bensonhurst and attended and graduated from Lafayette High School in Brooklyn. He studied at Brandeis University in Waltham, Massachusetts, and San Diego State University, ultimately deciding to become a writer. In 1969, he met the woman who would become his wife, Diana Meehan. They founded and ran a day care center in Berkeley, California, during the 1970s.

Career
Goldberg began his show business career while living in Israel in 1972, landing the lead role of Scooterman in the English teaching show The Adventures of Scooterman.  His first "real job" not in front of the camera came in 1976, when he became a writer for CBS' The Bob Newhart Show.  This was followed by The Dumplings, The Tony Randall Show, and later CBS's Lou Grant, for which he was also producer.

In 1982 he formed his own company Ubu Productions (named after his Labrador retriever Ubu Roi, who died in 1984).  In 1982 he created Family Ties which ran for seven seasons and was a critical and ratings hit; it helped launch the career of Michael J. Fox.  He later produced Brooklyn Bridge and Spin City.  In 1989 he produced and directed the feature film with a marquée cast, Dad, starring Jack Lemmon, Ted Danson, and Olympia Dukakis. This film was followed by Bye Bye Love (which he produced but did not direct), starring Matthew Modine, Paul Reiser and Randy Quaid; and Must Love Dogs, starring Diane Lane and John Cusack.  He received two Emmy awards (1979 for Lou Grant, 1987 for Family Ties) and four Writers Guild of America Awards (1979, 1988, 1998, 2010) for his work. He also received the Women in Film Lucy Award in recognition of excellence and innovation in creative works that have enhanced the perception of women through the medium of television in 1994 and the Austin Film Festival's Outstanding Television Writer Award in 2001.

Controversy 

Beginning in 2000, Tracy Keenan Wynn and more than 150 television writers over the age of 40 filed 23 class-action lawsuits that charged Hollywood's television industry—networks, studios, talent agencies and production companies—with age discrimination. A prominent industry quote cited in the case came from Gary David Goldberg, who told TV Guide Magazine that Spin City had "no writers on the set over the age of 29 — by design."

On January 6, 2009, the Superior Court of the State of California, for the County of Los Angeles, granted final approval to a consent decree resolving age discrimination claims asserted against defendants International Creative Management, Inc. (ICM) and Broder Kurland Webb Agency (BKW). The consent decree affected a full and final resolution of the class claims, including all individual claims subsumed in the cases. Under the terms of the consent decree, defendants ICM and BKW paid $4.5 million into a settlement fund.

Personal life
Goldberg died of a brain tumor in Montecito, California on June 22, 2013, at the age of 68.

His daughter is comedy writer Shana Goldberg-Meehan.

Filmography

Film

Television

Bibliography

References

External links
 GaryDavidGoldberg.com – official website
 

1944 births
2013 deaths
Jewish American screenwriters
American television writers
American male television writers
American male screenwriters
Television producers from California
People from Bensonhurst, Brooklyn
Deaths from brain cancer in the United States
Lafayette High School (New York City) alumni
Brandeis University alumni
San Diego State University alumni
Film directors from New York City
Screenwriters from New York (state)
Television producers from New York City
Screenwriters from California